Beit Einun or Bayt 'Anun is a Palestinian village in the Hebron Governorate, located five kilometers northeast of Hebron in the southern West Bank. According to the Palestinian Central Bureau of Statistics, the village had a population of 1,809 inhabitants in 2007.

The Israeli army has a major road block at Beit Einun Junction. Following the upsurge in violence from October 2015 it has been a focus of attacks against soldiers by young Palestinians. The attackers are usually shot dead. In the first two weeks of 2016 there were three separate incidents in which four young Palestinian attackers were killed, no soldiers were injured.

History

Iron Age 
One opinion suggests that Beit Einun is the modern site of the Biblical Beth-anoth. Another view suggests that it is the biblical site of Enam (Joshua 15:34),"a village about 2 km. from the renowned terebinth" that grew near Hebron.

Classical period 
Several ossuaries dated to the 1st century CE have been found at Beit Einun. A number of them bear inscriptions in Aramaic and Greek, and one bears an inscription in Hebrew with the word "Israel".

Byzantine period 
The site became populated during Byzantine rule of Palestine, and ceramics from that period has been found.  Three churches were built near the center of the town sometime between the 5th and 6th centuries. The wall construction indicates rebuilding of the church in the Crusader period. Excavations have revealed a mosaic floor in the main hall of the church from the Byzantine period. It is a part of a complex building in which living quarters and storage rooms, as well as water cisterns were found. Other remains from this time period include two water cisterns, two wine-presses and several tombs.

Early Islamic period 
Beit 'Einun is mentioned in the Waqf dedication given by the Islamic prophet Muhammad to Tamim al-Dari, a sahaba ("companion"). Many Muslim-built stone structures are located in the village. According to Al-Muqaddasi,  Beit Einun was well known in the Middle East during the Abbasid era, for producing high-quality raisins named 'Aynuni after the village's name (Bayt Aynun).

Ottoman era
The village was incorporated into the Ottoman Empire in 1517 with all of Palestine, and in 1596  Beit Einun appeared in Ottoman  tax registers   as being in the Nahiya of Halil of the Liwa of  Quds.  It had a population of 18 Muslim households, and paid taxes on wheat, barley,  vineyards, fruit trees, occasional revenues, goats and/or bee hives.

In 1838 Edward Robinson noted it in ruins.

In July 1863 the French explorer Victor Guérin visited the place, called Khirbet Beit-A'noun. He inspected the ruins, and dated them to the Byzantine era.

In 1883 the PEF's Survey of Palestine found here "walls, foundations, and a reservoir. There is a spring to the wast, and on the south a small  ruined chapel; the walls and pillar-chafts remaining; this is called el Keniseh.  Remains of a tower with large drafted masonry also exist; it measures 82 feet north and south by 72 feet east and west. The stones are in some cases 6 feet long and 3 feet high."

Geography
Beit Einun is situated in the 'Anun Valley, at the bottom of a hill in the Judea region, forming the beginning of a fertile plain cultivated with vines and grains. There are terraces on the higher slopes of the hill to prevent erosion. These small separate fields are planted with grape and tomato vines, plum and almond orchards. Beit Einun is located just five kilometers north of Hebron. Other nearby localities include, Sa'ir and ash-Shuyukh to the northeast, Halhul to the northwest, Beit Kahil to the west and Ras Abu Risha to the southeast.

Demographics
Beit Einun's population drastically decreased after the Six-Day War in 1967, from 4,967 to just a few hundred residents. Most of the inhabitants left for Jordan. In the 1997 census by the Palestinian Central Bureau of Statistics (PCBS), Beit Einun had a population of 1,748. The gender make-up was 906 males and 842 females. Palestinian refugees constituted 15.6% of the village's inhabitants. In 2004, Beit Einun had a population of 2,277 inhabitants, rising to 2,439 in 2006 according to PCBS estimates. However, the PCBS 2007 census revealed that Beit Einun had 1,809 inhabitants.

References

Bibliography

External links
 Welcome To Bayt 'Anun
Survey of Western Palestine, Map 21:    IAA, Wikimedia commons
Halt of construction notifications against mosque, houses and stone quarries in Beit Einun 15 April 2009, POICA
 Reopening Beit 'Einun Entrance 16 May 2012, POICA

Villages in the West Bank
Municipalities of the State of Palestine